Vincent Kokert (born 6 April 1978) is a German politician for the Christian Democratic Union of Germany (CDU).

Career 
Kokert was born in 1979 in Neustrelitz and became a member of the CDU in 1997.
Kokert has been a member of the Landtag of Mecklenburg-Vorpommern, the legislative body of the federal state of Mecklenburg-Vorpommern, since 2002 and became the chairman of the CDU in Mecklenburg-Vorpommern in 2017. By early 2020, he announced his resignation and left politics.

Other activities 
 Konrad Adenauer Foundation (KAS), Member of the Board of Trustees

References

1979 births
Living people
Christian Democratic Union of Germany politicians